Ban Gowd-e Ahmadi (also Romanized as Ban Gowd-e Aḩmadī) is a village in Ahmadi Rural District, Ahmadi District, Hajjiabad County, Hormozgan Province, Iran. At the 2006 census, its population was 554, in 128 families.

References 

Populated places in Hajjiabad County